The Chinese Taipei national football team represents Taiwan (the Republic of China) in international football and is controlled by the Chinese Taipei Football Association. Despite never qualifying for the FIFA World Cup, Chinese Taipei, then known as Republic of China, reached the semi-finals of the 1960 and 1968 AFC Asian Cups, finishing third in the former. The side also won gold at the 1954 and 1958 Asian Games, although the players in the team originated from British Hong Kong.

History
The Chinese Taipei Football Association (CTFA) was founded in Mainland China as the China Football Association (CFA) in 1924 and relocated to Taiwan in 1949 at the end of the Chinese Civil War. Affiliated with FIFA in 1932 as China, the country rejoined FIFA in 1954, first under the name Taiwan, then renaming to Chinese Taipei in 1980.

The team's greatest success came when they finished third at the AFC Asian Cup in 1960 as Taiwan. However, the players in the team originally came from Hong Kong, despite the Hong Kongese national team not being one of the best in Asia.

Due to the political conflict with the People's Republic of China (China PR), Taiwan, now known as Chinese Taipei, was part of the Oceania Football Confederation and participated in the Oceanian World Cup qualifiers from 1975 to 1989.

Chinese Taipei reached their highest FIFA World Ranking of 121st in July 2018, under the guidance of renowned English coach Gary White. Since his arrival in the autumn of 2017, White's strategies aimed not only to improve the national team, but also the standards of football on the island. An extended scouting operation looking for talents of Taiwanese heritage from abroad was also part of his plans. The cast proved to be successful when players such as Tim Chow, Will Donkin and Emilio Estevez were tapped in for the national team.

In December 2017, Chinese Taipei hosted the CTFA International Tournament, an A-level competition that also included Laos, the Philippines and Timor-Leste. It was created to test the country's team in preparation for international friendlies and tournaments in future years. Chinese Taipei won all of their three games, winning the mini-tournament and their first official international trophy in 55 years. Thanks to the four goals he scored (two of which in the final match against Laos), striker Li Mao was deemed as the competition's top scorer.

White led a successful period for the Chinese Taipei, including winning 7 FIFA international games in a row. Charged with taking Taiwan to their first AFC Asian Cup since 1968, White had taken over the guide of the national team halfway through the qualification campaign: eventually, he brought them to the third round of the qualifiers, missing a spot to the tournament (in favour of Bahrain and Turkmenistan) by just one point. White was then offered a contract by the Hong Kong national team and left his role in Taiwan in September 2018.

Following the Englishman's departure, Taiwan went on a severe lack of satisfaction during the following year. Vom Ca-nhum, employed as a caretaker manager while he was guiding the Chinese Taipei U19 squad, had not been able to qualify his side to the final round of the EAFF E-1 Football Championship (even though they won their match against Mongolia). Then, another Englishman, Louis Lancaster, who previously assisted Gary White during his time on the island, was appointed as the main coach to take his first senior management position. However, things got even worse for the Chinese Taipei: in 2019, the team won just one out of the nine matches they played (a 2–0 win in a friendly against Hong Kong), and they were prematurely eliminated from the continental qualifiers for the 2022 FIFA World Cup, losing all of their first five games and getting thrashed by Australia (1–7), Kuwait (9–0) and Jordan (5–0). Following the shocking results in the first phase of the qualifiers, Lancaster was sacked in December 2019, and the federation soon decided to hire Vom Ca-nhum again, this time on a full basis, as he was one of the few coaches on the island to have already gained an AFC Pro A coaching license.

Stadium
Many of the team's home matches were played in the Chungshan Soccer Stadium in Taipei, which was closed in 2008. The stadium's capacity was slightly above 20,000 and is a football specific stadium.

The qualification match for 2012 AFC Challenge Cup in February 2011 was played on Kaohsiung National Stadium, while the qualification match for 2014 FIFA World Cup in July 2011 was played at Taipei Municipal Stadium.

Kit

As of January 2023, the official kit supplier is local Taiwanese sports brand Entes.

Recent results and fixtures

The following is a list of match results from the previous 12 months, as well as any future matches that have been scheduled.

2022

Coaching staff

Coaching history
Caretaker managers are listed in italics.

 Ngan Shing-kwan (1936)
 Lee Wai Tong (1954–1958)
  Ho Ying Fun (1966)
 Pau King Yin (1966, 1968, 1971)
 Hsu King Shing (1967)
 Law Pak (1977–1981)
 Chiang Chia (1981–1985)
 Lo Chih-tsung (1985–1988)
 Huang Jen-cheng (1988–1993)
 Chiang Mu-tsai (1994–2000)
 Huang Jen-cheng (2000–2001)
 Lee Po-houng (2001–2005)
 Edson Silva (2005)
 Toshiaki Imai (2005–2007)
 Chen Sing-An (2008–2009)
 Lo Chih-tsung (2009–2011)
 Lee Tae-ho (2011)
 Chen Kuei-jen (2012)
 Chiang Mu-tsai (2012)
 Chen Kuei-jen (2013–2016)
 Toshiaki Imai (2016)
 Kazuo Kuroda (2016–2017)
 Reiji Hirata (2017)
 Gary White (2017–2018)
 Vom Ca-nhum (2018)
 Louis Lancaster (2019)
 Vom Ca-nhum (2020–2021) 
 Yeh Hsien-chung (2021)
 Yak Shin-feng (2022)
 Yeh Hsien-chung (2022–)

Players

Current squad
 The following players were called up for the friendly match.
 Match dates: 14 December 2022
 Opposition: 
 Caps and goals correct as of: 11 October 2021, after the match against .

Recent call-ups
The following players also received a call-up within the last twelve months.

Player records

Players in bold are still active with Chinese Taipei.

Most appearances

Top goalscorers

Competition history

 Champions   Runners-up   Third place  
 Fourth place  

FIFA World Cup

Olympic Games record

AFC Asian Cup record

AFC Challenge Cup record

East Asian Cup

Asian Games

 Honours 
 AFC Asian Cup  Third place (1): 1960
 Asian Games  Gold medal''' (2): 1954, 1958

See also

 List of Taiwanese footballers
 Chinese Taipei national futsal team
 Chinese Taipei women's national football team

Notes

References

External links

 Chinese Taipei at 2006 FIFA World Cup official website
 Chinese Taipei Football Association official website 
 Chinese Taipei national team squad at CTFA official website 

 
Asian national association football teams
Football in Taiwan